Cook is an unincorporated community in Madison Township, Fayette County, Ohio, United States.

The community is named after Matthew S. Cook, the original owner of the town site, who gave the right of way to the Baltimore and Ohio Railroad. The Cook Post Office was established on January 20, 1885, but closed on March 31, 1933. The mail service is now sent through the Mount Sterling branch.

References 

Unincorporated communities in Fayette County, Ohio
Unincorporated communities in Ohio